Abu ol Kheyr or Abowlkheyr may refer to:
 Abu ol Kheyr, Isfahan
 Abu ol Kheyr, Khuzestan

See also
 Abu ol Kheyri